Nel Noddings (January 19, 1929 – August 25, 2022) was an American feminist, educator, and philosopher best known for her work in philosophy of education, educational theory, and ethics of care.

Biography
Noddings received a bachelor's degree in mathematics and physical science from Montclair State University in New Jersey, a master's degree in mathematics from Rutgers University, and a PhD in education from the Stanford Graduate School of Education.

Nel Noddings worked in many areas of the education system. She spent seventeen years as an elementary and high school mathematics teacher and school administrator, before earning her PhD and beginning work as an academic in the fields of philosophy of education, theory of education and ethics, specifically moral education and ethics of care. She became a member of the Stanford faculty in 1977, and was the Jacks Professor of Child Education from 1992 until 1998. While at Stanford University she received awards for teaching excellence in 1981, 1982 and 1997, and was the associate dean or acting dean of the School of Education for four years. After leaving Stanford University, she held positions at Columbia University and Colgate University. She was past president of the Philosophy of Education Society and the John Dewey Society. In 2002–2003 she held the John W. Porter Chair in Urban Education at Eastern Michigan University. She was Lee L. Jacks Professor of Education, Emerita, at Stanford University from 1998.

Nel Noddings has 10 children, 39 grandchildren, and over 20 great-grandchildren, many of whom are highly educated and educators themselves. In 2012 she lost her husband of over 60 years to cancer.

Noddings's fruitful career was matched by an equally fruitful domestic life. According to infed.org, Noddings described herself as "'incurably domestic' not only because she and her husband raised ten children, but because she also appreciated "order in the kitchen, a fresh tablecloth, flowers on the table and food waiting for guests'. She added, 'I like having pets and kids around'. Feminists, she commented, sometimes find it hard to admit such things matter to them."

She had described her early educational experiences and her close relationships as key in her development of her philosophical position. Early relationships with caring teachers inspired her passion for her later work.

Personality 
Colleague Michael Katz described Noddings as "one of the most efficient people" he knows, a "consummate teacher–scholar," who lives according to the "do it now" philosophy and "never lets her status as a famous scholar and lecturer and author interfere with treating everyone with the same kindness, thoughtfulness, and consideration that she would expect people to show her, regardless of her status or position."

Work

Contributions to philosophy
Noddings's first sole-authored book Caring: A Feminine Approach to Ethics and Moral Education (1984) followed close on the 1982 publication of Carol Gilligan's ground-breaking work in the ethics of care In a Different Voice. While her work on ethics continued, with the publication of Women and Evil (1989), and later works on moral education, most of her later publications have been on the philosophy of education and educational theory. Her most significant works in these areas have been Educating for Intelligent Belief or Unbelief (1993) and Philosophy of Education (1995).

Besides contributing to philosophy, Noddings also worked in the field of social psychology. Noddings was on the Editorial Board of Greater Good Magazine, published by the Greater Good Science Center of the University of California, Berkeley. Noddings's contributions include the interpretation of scientific research into the roots of compassion, altruism, and peaceful human relationships.

Nel Noddings's relational ethics
Nel Noddings's approach to ethics of care has been described as relational ethics because it prioritizes concern for relationships. Like Carol Gilligan, Noddings accepts that justice based approaches, which are supposed to be more masculine, are genuine alternatives to ethics of care. However, unlike Gilligan, Noddings's believes that caring, 'rooted in receptivity, relatedness, and responsiveness' is a more basic and preferable approach to ethics (Caring 1984, 2).

Caring: A Feminine Approach to Ethics and Moral Education
The key to understanding Noddings's ethics of care is to understand her notion of caring and ethical caring in particular.

Noddings believes that it would be a mistake to try to provide a systematic examination of the requirements for caring; nevertheless, she does suggest three requirements for caring (Caring 1984, 11–12). She argues that the carer (one-caring) must exhibit engrossment and motivational displacement, and the person who is cared for (cared-for) must respond in some way to the caring (1984, 69). Noddings's term engrossment refers to thinking about someone in order to gain a greater understanding of him or her. Engrossment is necessary for caring because an individual's personal and physical situation must be understood before the one-caring can determine the appropriateness of any action. 'Engrossment' need not entail, as the term seems to suggest, a deep fixation on the other. It requires only the attention needed to come to understand the position of the other. Engrossment could not on its own constitute caring; someone could have a deep understanding of another person, yet act against that person's interests. Motivational displacement prevents this from occurring. Motivational displacement occurs when the one-caring's behaviour is largely determined by the needs of the person for whom she is caring. On its own, motivational displacement would also be insufficient for ethical caring. For example, someone who acted primarily from a desire to accomplish something for another person, but failed to think carefully enough about that other person's needs (failed to be correctly engrossed in the other), would fail to care. Finally, Noddings believes that caring requires some form of recognition from the cared-for that the one-caring is, in fact, caring. When there is a recognition of and response to the caring by the person cared for, Noddings describes the caring as "completed in the other" (1984, 4).

Nel Noddings draws an important distinction between natural caring and ethical caring (1984, 81–83). Noddings distinguishes between acting because "I want" and acting because "I must". When I care for someone because "I want" to care, say I hug a friend who needs hugging in an act of love, Noddings claims that I am engaged in natural caring. When I care for someone because "I must" care, say I hug an acquaintance who needs hugging in spite of my desire to escape that person's pain, according to Noddings, I am engaged in ethical caring. Ethical caring occurs when a person acts caringly out of a belief that caring is the appropriate way of relating to people. When someone acts in a caring way because that person naturally cares for another, the caring is not ethical caring (1984, 79–80). Noddings claims that ethical caring is based on, and so dependent on, natural caring (1984, 83, 206 fn 4). It is through experiencing others caring for them and naturally caring for others that people build what is called an "ethical ideal", an image of the kind of person they want to be.

Noddings describes wrong actions in terms of "a diminishment of the ethical ideal" and "evil". A person's ethical ideal is diminished when she either chooses or is forced to act in a way that rejects her internal call to care. In effect, her image of the best person it is possible for her to be is altered in a way that lowers her ideal. According to Noddings, people and organizations can deliberately or carelessly contribute to the diminishment of others' ethical ideals. They may do this by teaching people not to care, or by placing them in conditions that prevent them from being able to care (1984, 116–119). A person is evil if, in spite of her ability to do otherwise, she either fails to personally care for someone, or prevents others from caring. Noddings writes, "[when] one intentionally rejects the impulse to care and deliberately turns her back on the ethical, she is evil, and this evil cannot be redeemed" (1984, 115).

This is referred to as "obligation". "There are moments for all of us when we care quite naturally. We just do care; no ethical effort is required. 'Want' and 'ought' are indistinguishable in such cases." I have the ability to "abstain from action if I believe that anything I might do would tend to work against the best interests of the cared-for." According to Noddings we are obligated to pursue the "musts".

Criticisms of Noddings's relational ethics
Nel Noddings's ethics of care has been criticised by both feminists and those who favour more traditional, and allegedly masculine, approaches to ethics. In brief, feminists object that the one caring is, in effect, carrying out the traditional female role in life of giving while receiving little in return. Those who accept more traditional approaches to ethics argue that the partiality shown to those closest to us in Noddings's theory is inappropriate.

Noddings tends to use unequal relationships as a model for understanding caring. Philosopher and feminist Sarah Lucia Hoagland argues that the relationships in question, such as parenting and teaching, are ideally relationships where caring is a transitory thing designed to foster the independence of the cared-for, and so end the unequal caring relationship. Unequal relationships, she writes, are ethically problematic, and so a poor model for an ethical theory. Hoagland argues that on Noddings's account of ethical caring, the one-caring is placed in the role of the giver and the cared-for in the role of the taker. The one-caring is dominant, choosing what is good for the cared-for, but gives without receiving caring in return. The cared-for is put in the position of being a dependent, with insufficient control over the nature of the caring. Hoagland believes that such unequal relationships cannot be morally good.

Contributions to education

Ethic of care in education

In education, the ethic of care speaks of obligation to do something right and a sense that we must do something right when others address us. The "I must" response is induced in direct encounter in preparation for response.  We respond because we want to; either we love and respect those that address us or we have significant regard for them. As a result, the recipients of care must respond in a way that demonstrates their caring has been received.

In regards to education, caring refers to the relationship between student and teacher, not just the person who cares. As educators respond to the needs of students, teachers may see the need to design a differentiated curriculum because as they work closely with students, they will be moved by students' different needs and interests. The claim to care must not be based on a one-time virtuous decision but an ongoing interest in the student's welfare.

Needs in the ethic of care model

Distinction

In "Identifying Needs in Education" Noddings (2003) provides criteria for deciding whether a want should be recognized or treated as a need. The criteria are as follows:
 The want is fairly stable over a considerable period of time and/or it is intense.
 The want is demonstrably connected to some desirable end or, at least, to one that is not harmful; further, the end is impossible or difficult to reach without the object wanted.
 The want is in the power (within the means) of those addressed to grant it.
 The person wanting is willing and able to contribute to the satisfaction of the want.

Inferred needs
The overt or explicit curriculum in education is designed to meet the inferred needs of students, as they are those identified by teachers or individuals to improve the classroom learning environment.  In the ethics of care philosophy, inferred needs are referred to as those that come from those not directly expressing the need.  Most needs identified by educators for learners are inferred needs because they are not being identified by the learners themselves. Students' inferred needs can often be identified interactively, through working with them one on one or observing their behaviour in a classroom environment.

Expressed needs 
Expressed needs are difficult to assess and address in the classroom environment, as they are needs directly expressed by learners through behaviour or words. Although expressed needs are difficult to address, educators need to treat them positively in order to maintain a caring relationship with learners.  If expressed needs are not treated carefully, the individual might not feel cared for. Educators should make a consistent effort to respond to a student's expressed needs through prior planning and discussions of moral and social issues surrounding the needs.

Basic (universal) needs
Basic needs are defined as the most basic needs required to survive such as food, water and shelter. Basic needs and needs associated with self-actualization (overwhelming needs) co-exist when basic needs are being compromised over extended periods of time.

Overwhelming needs
Overwhelming needs cannot be met by the usual processes of schooling and include extreme instances such as abuse, neglect and illness. As well, a student's socioeconomic status (SES) or dysfunctional family environment can cause them to come to school with needs that cannot be expressed nor met by educators.  To help meet those overwhelming needs of students, particularly those in poor neighborhood, the ethic of care philosophy dictates that schools should be full-service institutions. Medical and dental care, social services, childcare and parenting advice should be available on campus. In turn, students in these situations are often forced into academic courses and fight an uphill battle, where they have to engage in activities that are difficult to focus on, based on their circumstances.

Implications for education
People who are poor, perhaps homeless, without dependable transportation cannot afford to run all over town seeking such services, and often they don't know where to begin. Despite being aware of the overwhelming needs many students face, we force all children—regardless of interest or aptitude—into academic courses and then fight an uphill battle to motivate them to do things they do not want to do.

Emotion and professionalism in teacher education
Emotion has been aggravated by the rise of professions with their insistence on detachment, distance, cool appraisal and systematic procedures. Concern for rational and professional functioning keeps emotion out of education, as it is supposed that real professionals do not allow themselves to feel controlled by their emotions and are forced to face problems with dispassionate rationality. Noddings states that in the teaching profession, the concern takes several forms:
 Fear that professional judgment will be impaired by emotions
 Professionals must learn to protect themselves against the burnout that may result from feeling too much for one's students
 It has become a mark of professionalism to be detached, cool and dispassionate

The use of stories in teacher education could be powerful in dispelling these beliefs, as they illustrate how deeply experienced teachers feel about the inevitable difficulties that occur in the classroom.

Educating the whole child
In the ethic of care model, the aim of education is centered around happiness.  Incorporating this component into education involves not only helping our students understand the components of happiness by allowing teachers and students to interact as a whole community.  In regard to the education of the whole child, Noddings (2005) stated that, "We will not find the solution to problems of violence, alienation, ignorance, and unhappiness in increasing our security, imposing more tests, punishing schools for their failure to produce 100 percent proficiency, or demanding that teachers be knowledgeable in the subjects they teach. Instead, we must allow teachers and students to interact as whole persons, and we must develop policies that treat the school as a whole community."

Criticisms of the ethic of Care in education
One criticism of Noddings's ethic of care, in regards to education, is that it advocates little importance to caring for oneself, except as a means to provide further care for others. In regards to education, the teacher–student relationship could be jeopardized because the educator might not engage in self-care, and instead devote all their energy into meeting their students' needs. Hoaglard states that the caregiver would be defined as a "martyr, servant or slave" by the philosophy in the ethic of care.  								

Another criticism of Noddings's argument is that ethic of care may result not only in the exploitation of the caregiver, but also in a smothering paternalism. Goodin writes that, "the trouble with subsuming individuals into relationships of 'we'ness is precisely that we then risk losing track of the separateness of people". As well, Goodin states that Noddings's criteria for implicit and explicit needs assumes that needs are transparent to the caregiver and that the caregiver's perceptions are privileged in the process of interpreting needs.  Lastly, Grimshaw explains that it is important to consider that good care always entails an element of distance between individuals. She states, "Care and understanding require the sort of distance that is needed in order not to see the other as a projection of the self, or self as a continuation of other". Thus, a clear distance between the self and the individual that is being cared for needs to exist in order to keep the personal care of both individuals in mind.

Selected works
Awakening the Inner Eye: Intuition in Education (co-author with Paul J. Shore). New York: Teachers College Columbia University, 1984.
Caring: A Feminine Approach to Ethics and Moral Education. Berkeley: University of California Press, 1984.  Publisher's promotion
Women and Evil. Berkeley: University of California Press, 1989. Publisher's promotion
Constructivist Views on the Teaching and Learning of Mathematics (co-author with Robert B. Davis and Carolyn Alexander Maher). Journal for Research in Mathematics Education, Monograph no. 4, Reston, Va.: National Council of Teachers of Mathematics, 1990.
Stories Lives Tell: Narrative and Dialogue in Education (co-author with Carol Witherell). New York: Teachers College Press, 1991.
The Challenge to Care in Schools: An Alternative Approach to Education. Advances in Contemporary Educational Thought series, vol. 8. New York: Teachers College Press, 1992.
Educating for Intelligent Belief or Unbelief. The John Dewey Lecture. New York: Teachers College Press, 1993.
Philosophy of Education. Dimensions of Philosophy series. Boulder, Colorado: Westview Press, 1995.
Caregiving: Readings in Knowledge, Practice, Ethics, and Politics (co-edited with Suzanne Gordon, Patricia E. Benner). Studies in Health, Illness, and Caregiving in America. Philadelphia: University of Pennsylvania Press, 1996.
Awakening the Inner Eye: Intuition in Education (co-author with Paul J. Shore). Troy, NY: Educator's International Press, 1998.
Justice and Caring: The Search for Common Ground in Education (co-author with Michael S. Katz and Kenneth A. Strike). Professional Ethics in Education series. New York: Teachers College Press, 1999. Publisher's promotion
Uncertain Lives: Children of Promise, Teachers of Hope (co-author with Robert V. Bullough). New York: Teachers College Press, 2001.
Educating Moral People. New York: Teachers College Press, 2002.
Starting at Home: Caring and Social Policy. Berkeley: University of California Press, 2002. Publisher's promotion Review
Happiness and Education. Cambridge: Cambridge University Press, 2003. Publisher's promotion
Critical Issues in Education: Dialogues and Dialectics (Co-author with Jack L. Nelson, Stuart B. Palonsky, and Mary Rose McCarthy). 2003
No Education Without Relation (Co-author with Charles Bingham, and Alexander M. Sidorkin). Counterpoints: Studies in the Postmodern Theory of Education, 259. Peter Lang Publishing, 2004. Publisher's promotion
Educating Citizens for Global Awareness (editor). New York: Teachers College Press, 2005. Boston Research Center for the 21st Century Publisher's promotion
Critical Lessons: What Our Schools Should Teach. Cambridge: Cambridge University Press, 2006. Publisher's promotion
Moral Matters: Five Ways to Develop the Moral Life of Schools (co-author with Barbara Senkowski Stengel, and R. Tom Alan). New York: Teachers College Press, 2006.
Education and Democracy in the 21st Century. Teachers College Press, 2013.
A Richer, Brighter Vision for American High Schools. Cambridge: Cambridge University Press, 2015.

See also

Citations

References
Anderson, Carol. 'EMU's Porter Chair Noddings says addressing physical needs of students can improve success'. Eastern Michigan University press release. October 30, 2002. Emich.edu
Flinders, D. J. 'Nel Noddings'. In Joy A. Palmer (ed.) Fifty modern thinkers on education: From Piaget to the present. London: Routledge, 2001.
Engster, Daniel. Care Ethics and National Law Theory: Towards an institutional political theory of	caring. Journal of Politics, 66 (4). 2004.
Goodin, Robert. 1996. "Structures of Political Order: The Relational Feminist Alternative." Political Order: NOMOS 38: 498–521.
Grimshaw, Jean. 1986.  Philosophy and Feminist Thinking. Minneapolis: University of Minnesota	Press.
Hoagland, Sarah Lucia. 'Some Concerns about Nel Noddings' Caring'''. Hypatia 5 (1), 1990.
Hoagland, Sarah. "Some Thoughts about Caring." In  Feminist Ethics, ed. Claudia Card.		Lawrence: University Press of Kansas, 1991. pp. 246–63
Noddings, Nel. Caring: A Feminine Approach to Ethics and Moral Education. Berkeley: University of California Press, 1984.
Noddings, Nel. Stories and affect in Teacher Education. Cambridge Journal of Education, 26 (3). 1996.
Noddings, Nel. Justice and Caring: The Search for Common Ground in Education. Teachers College	Press, New York, 1999.
Noddings, Nel. Identifying and Responding to needs in Teacher Education. Cambridge Journal of	Education, 35 (2). 2005
Noddings, Nel. What does it mean to Educate the WHOLE child?. Educational Leadership, 63 (1).	2005.
Smith, M. K. 'Nel Noddings, the ethics of care and education'. In The encyclopaedia of informal education. Infed.org, 2004.
Tong, Rosemarie. 'Nel Noddings's relational ethics'. In Feminine and Feminist Ethics. Belmost, Calif: Wadsworth, 1993.
O'Toole, K. 'Noddings: To know what matters to you, observe your actions'. Stanford Online Report, February 4, 1998. Stanford.edu

External links
Center for ethical deliberation, 'Feminist care ethics'. Cambridge.org
O'Toole, K. 'Noddings: To know what matters to you, observe your actions', Stanford online report, February 4, 1998. Stanford.edu
Smith, M. K. 'Nel Noddings, the ethics of care and education', The encyclopaedia of informal education, 2004. Infed.org
Feminist Ethics, Stanford encyclopedia of philosophy, Stanford.edu Nodding's editorial contributions to the field of psychology in Greater Good'' magazine. Greatergoodmag.org
"Nel Noddings: An Oral History," Stanford Historical Society Oral History Program, 2016.

1929 births
2022 deaths
20th-century American philosophers
20th-century American women writers
20th-century educational theorists
21st-century American non-fiction writers
21st-century American philosophers
21st-century American women writers
American ethicists
American feminist writers
American women non-fiction writers
American women philosophers
Democratic education
Feminist ethicists
Feminist philosophers
Montclair State University alumni
Relational ethics
Rutgers University alumni
Stanford Graduate School of Education faculty
Stanford University alumni
Philosophers of education
People from Irvington, New Jersey